In information theory, the binary entropy function, denoted  or , is defined as the entropy of a Bernoulli process with probability  of one of two values. Mathematically, the Bernoulli trial is modelled as a random variable  that can take on only two values: 0 and 1, which are mutually exclusive and exhaustive.

,

where  is taken to be 0.  The logarithms in this formula are usually taken (as shown in the graph) to the base 2. See binary logarithm.

When , the binary entropy function attains its maximum value.  This is the case of an unbiased coin flip.

 is distinguished from the entropy function  in that the former takes a single real number as a parameter whereas the latter takes a distribution or random variable as a parameter.

Explanation
In terms of information theory, entropy is considered to be a measure of the uncertainty in a message. To put it intuitively, suppose . At this probability, the event is certain never to occur, and so there is no uncertainty at all, leading to an entropy of 0. If , the result is again certain, so the entropy is 0 here as well. When , the uncertainty is at a maximum; if one were to place a fair bet on the outcome in this case, there is no advantage to be gained with prior knowledge of the probabilities. In this case, the entropy is maximum at a value of 1 bit. Intermediate values fall between these cases; for instance, if , there is still a measure of uncertainty on the outcome, but one can still predict the outcome correctly more often than not, so the uncertainty measure, or entropy, is less than 1 full bit.

Derivative
The derivative of the binary entropy function may be expressed as the negative of the logit function:
.

Taylor series
The Taylor series of the binary entropy function in a neighborhood of 1/2 is

Bounds
The following bounds hold for :

and

where  denotes natural logarithm.

See also
 Metric entropy
 Information theory
 Information entropy
Quantities of information

References

Further reading
 MacKay, David J. C. Information Theory, Inference, and Learning Algorithms Cambridge: Cambridge University Press, 2003. 

Entropy and information

zh-yue:二元熵函數